This is a list of Nepal women's team Twenty20 International cricket records. It includes the records of team Nepal and player's individual performances in Twenty20 International cricket.

On 26 April 2018, ICC announced that all Twenty20 matches played between ICC members after the cut off date of 1 July 2018 would be awarded Twenty20 International status. Thus, Nepal women played their first Twenty20 International match against China women on 12 January 2019, and these records date from that match.

Listing criteria 

In general the top five are listed in each category (except when there is a tie for the last place among the five, in which case, all the tied record holders are noted).

Any player in bold has played at least one match in the last or ongoing series/tournament.

Team records

Team wins & losses

Matches played (total)

Matches played (by country)

First bilateral T20I series wins

Team scoring records

Highest innings totals

Lowest innings totals

Highest match aggregate 
Team chasing the target is shown in the beginning.

Lowest match aggregate 
Team chasing the target is shown in the beginning.

Highest win margins (by wickets)

Highest win margins (by runs)

Highest win margin (by balls remaining)

Lowest win margins (by runs)

Lowest win margin (by wickets)

Lowest win margin (by balls remaining)

Individual records

Individual records (batting)

Most career runs

Highest career average

Highest career strike rate

Highest individual score

Most fifties and over

Most Centuries

Most career sixes

Most career Fours

Highest strike rate in an innings

Most Ducks

Most Runs in a Series

Individual records (bowling)

Most career wickets

Best career averages

Best economy rates

Hat-tricks

Best figures in an innings

Most Four (and over) wickets in an innings

Most Five wickets in an innings

Most runs conceded in an innings

Most wickets in a series

Individual records (fielding) 
Does not include catches taken by wicketkeeper.

Most catches in career

Most catches in an innings

Most catches in a series

Individual records (wicketkeeping)

Most dismissals in career

Most dismissals in an innings

Most dismissals in a series

Individual records (other)

Most matches played in career

Most Matches played as Captain 

♣ denotes current captain.

Most matches won as captain

Partnership Records

Highest partnerships (by runs) 

Note: An asterisk (*) signifies an unbroken partnership (i.e. neither of the batsmen were dismissed before either the end of the allotted overs or they reached the required score).

Highest partnerships (by wicket) 

Note: An asterisk (*) signifies an unbroken partnership (i.e. neither of the batsmen were dismissed before either the end of the allotted overs or they reached the required score).

Notes and references 

 Nepal Twenty20 International Records at ESPNcricinfo.com

See also 
Nepal national cricket team
List of Nepal Twenty20 International cricketers
List of Twenty20 International records
List of Nepal One Day International records
List of Nepal Twenty20 International cricket records
Cricket Association of Nepal

Cricket in Nepal
Women's cricket-related lists
Twenty20